Emerson Park Academy, formerly Hornchurch Grammar School, is an academy school located in the Hornchurch area of the London Borough of Havering, England. It is situated just east of Emerson Park, between Hornchurch and Upminster.

History

Grammar School
The school was established in 1943 during World War II as Hornchurch County High School, and opened with 75 boys and girls and a staff of 4 teachers on Cedar Avenue in Upminster (now the site of Branfil Primary School). By 1952 there were 294 students and it was clear that larger premises were needed.

A new school was built after the war on farmlands extending from Wych Elm Road down to the River Ingrebourne, providing a large playing field area. The school was opened in September 1954, renamed Hornchurch Grammar School, and originally with 560 students. On 13 April 1964, the prime minister gave a talk at the school, and later in the year on 27 July the (new) prime minister also visited the school.

Mr Walter May was headmaster from 1952-70. During that period, all teachers wore academic gowns in the classroom. The school motto was "A Good Name Endureth", written beneath the same emblem used by the present academy. School houses were named Harwood, Langtons, Fairkytes and Tomkyns, after historical private houses in the area. Each year a new intake of pupils joined the first form, selected by passing the 11-plus exam. Subsequently, they were streamed by academic ability into A, Alpha, B and C streams.

The school buildings were extended several times, eventually accommodating over 800 boys and girls. Additions included woodwork and metalwork shops, an annex for the sixth form including a student common room, a cricket pavilion, a language lab with reel to reel tape recorders, and a swimming pool. The last two were paid for by fundraising organised by the Parents' Association (there was no Parent–Teacher Association).

In the early 1970s, the school held several notable school dances with visiting bands who later became world-famous, including The Sweet on 31 March 1969, and Roxy Music and Supertramp on the same bill on 25 July 1972.

Change to Comprehensive School
Mr May was succeeded by Mr John Fowler in 1970, who guided the changes to become a comprehensive school in 1973 named Emerson Park School. In 1991 the sixth form was transferred to a new, separate sixth form college.

The school was officially opened as a Specialist Sports College by Sir Trevor Brooking in 2004. The school became an academy in 2011 and renamed Emerson Park Academy, having around 1,000 students. The school continues to specialise in sports.

Academic performance
The Academy was inspected by Ofsted in November 2011 and was deemed to be a "good school with outstanding features".

In 2011 over 72% of students achieved 5 or more A*- C GCSE grades, including English and Mathematics. The number of students achieving 5 A* - C GCSE grades or more across the curriculum increased to 88%. This performance placed the Academy in the top 4 schools in the Borough and performing above average.

In 2012 59% of students achieved 5 or more A*- C GCSE grades, including English and Mathematics. This performance placed the Academy in the bottom five schools in the Borough and performing below average. Havering is one of the better London LEAs, with many well-performing schools. A-level provision is available at the nearby Havering Sixth Form College.

In 2014, results dropped to the lowest level in 7 years, with only 55% of students achieved 5 or more A*- C GCSE grades, including English and Mathematics. This is 5% lower than the LEA average.

Notable alumni
Hornchurch Grammar School
 Grapefruit - band
 Mike Oldfield - musician, left in 1968
 Andy C - musician
 Russell Gilbrook drummer since 2007 with Uriah Heep. Previously with Alan Price and Chris Barber. A 3rd dan in karate.

Emerson Park Comprehensive
 Andrew McDonald - civil servant and first chief executive of the Independent Parliamentary Standards Authority
 Nathan Elder - footballer
Alex Day - musician

Emerson Park Academy
 Michael Obafemi - footballer for Swansea City

Notes

References

External links
 2014 results government league tables
 EduBase'''
 Sports college in 2004
 2009 Ofsted Report/109611
 2009 Havering GCSE League Tables

Educational institutions established in 1954
Academies in the London Borough of Havering
Secondary schools in the London Borough of Havering
1954 establishments in England
Specialist sports colleges in England